Chattogram City Corporation (CCC) is a self-governing agency that governs the municipal areas of Chattogram and some adjoining areas of south-eastern Bangladesh.

CCC government is elected by popular vote every 5 years.

Administration 

Chattogram City Corporation is divided into 16 thanas: Akbarshah, Bakoliya, Bandar, Bayazid, Chandgaon, Double Mooring, Halishahar, Khulshi, Kotwali, Pahartali, Panchlaish, Patenga, Chawkbazar, Sadarghat, EPZ, and Karnaphuli. The thanas are subdivided into 41 wards and 211 mahallas. CCC also administers a portion of adjoining Hathazari Upazila.

Services 
The Chattogram City Corporation is responsible for administering and providing basic infrastructure to the city.
 Evict illegal installations.
 Purify and supply water.
 Treat and dispose of contaminated water and sewage.
 Eliminate waterlogging.
 Garbage removal and street cleaning.
 To manage solid waste.
 To arrange hospital and dispensary.
 Construction and maintenance of roads.
 Installation of electric street lights.
 Establish car parking.
 Maintenance parks and playground.
 Maintenance of cemeteries and crematoriums.
 Preparation of birth and death registration certificate.
 Preserving the traditional place.
 Disease control, immunization.
 Establishment of city corporation schools and colleges.

Ward List

List of Mayors 

Status

Elections

Election Result 2021

Election Result 2015

Election Result 2010

Election Result 2005

List of wards by thana/upazila
Hathazari Upazila- ward No. 01(part)
Bayazid - ward No. 02
Chandgaon - ward No. 04, 05, 06
Panchlaish - ward No. 01(part), 02, 03, 07, 08 (part), 15(part), 16 (part)
Akbarsha - ward No. 10
Pahartali - ward No. 09 (part),11 (part), 12 (part)
Khulshi - ward No. 08 (part), 09 (part), 13, 14
Bakoliya -ward No. 17, 18, 19, 35 (part)
Kotwali - ward No. 20, 21, 22, 30 (part), 31, 32, 33, 34, 35 (part), 15 (part), 16 (part)
Halishahar - ward No. 11 (part), 24 (part), 25, 26
Double Mooring - ward No.12 (part), 23, 24 (part), 27, 28, 29, 30 (part), 36 (part)
Bandar - ward No.36 (part), 37, 38, 39 (part)
Patenga -ward No. 39 (part), 40, 41.

References

External links
 Official website of Chattogram City Corporation

 
City Corporations of Bangladesh
Government of Chittagong